Jerry Jacobs (born September 26, 1997) is an American football cornerback for the Detroit Lions of the National Football League (NFL). He played college football at Hutchinson Community College, Arkansas State and Arkansas.

College career
Jacobs began his collegiate career at Hutchinson Community College. He Earned KJCC All-Conference honors his only season with the Blue Dragons and recorded 39 tackles and four interceptions. In 2017 he transferred to Arkansas State. During the 2018 season he recorded 31 tackles, four interceptions and eight pass breakups in 13 games. Following the season he was named second-team All-Sun Belt Conference. During the 2019 season, he made four starts with 21 tackles, and two pass breakups, before suffering a season-ending ACL tear. 

Following the season he transferred to Arkansas. On October 26, 2020, Jacobs opted out of the remaining six games of the season and declared for the 2021 NFL Draft. In four games with the Razorbacks, he recorded 17 tackles, including one for a loss. His 249 defensive snaps were the fourth-most on the team.

Professional career

On May 1, 2021, Jacobs signed with the Detroit Lions as an undrafted free agent. He was named to the Lions' 53-man roster and made his first career start in Week 5. He started the next nine games before suffering a torn ACL in Week 14. He was placed on injured reserve on December 13, 2021.

Jacobs was placed on the reserve/PUP list to start the 2022 season. He was activated on October 22.

References

External links
Detroit Lions bio
Arkansas Razorbacks bio
Arkansas State Red Wolves bio

1997 births
Living people
American football cornerbacks
Arkansas Razorbacks football players
Arkansas State Red Wolves football players
Detroit Lions players
Players of American football from Atlanta